Dominic Angelo Breazeale (born August 24, 1985) is an American professional boxer. He has challenged twice for heavyweight world titles; the IBF title in 2016 and the WBC title in 2019. As an amateur he represented the United States at the 2012 London Olympics.

Early life
Breazeale was born in Glendale, California, United States. He started playing football and was quarterback on the football team at Mt. SAC and the University of Northern Colorado before starting boxing.

Amateur career
Breazeale first started boxing at the age of 23. As an amateur, Breazeale won the 2012 U.S. National Super Heavyweight championship at the Fort Carson Special Events Center in Colorado Springs, Colorado. Breazeale later qualified for the 2012 Olympic Games in London after winning the Olympic trials and earning himself a place on the US Olympic team. He lost in the preliminary round to Russia's Magomed Omarov, with a score of 19–8.

Professional career

Early career
Breazeale made his professional debut on November 9, 2012 against Curtis Lee Tate. Breazeale won the fight by 1st round knock out. He fought again later that month, knocking out Mike Bissett in the second round. He went on to have multiple knock out wins in 2013. On August 24, 2013, Breazeale fought Jamaican Lenroy Thomas. Breazeale knocked Thomas out in the 4th round. He went on to get two more knock out wins against Jon Hill and Keith Barr towards the end of 2013. Breazeale's first fight of 2014 was against Homero Fonseca, Breazeale won the fight after Homero was retired on his stool after the 3rd round. Breazeale's next fight was against Nagy Aguilera, he won the fight by unanimous decision. This was the first time Breazeale had gone the distance. He went on to have three more knock out wins towards the end of 2014.

His first fight of 2015 was against Victor Bisbal, which he won by knock out in the 4th round. Breazeale then went on to knock out Yasmany Consuegra in the third round. On September 26, 2015, Breazeale won a controversial and disputed points decision over Cameroonian fighter Fred Kassi.

Breazeale vs. Martin cancellation
Breazeale was originally scheduled to face fellow contender Charles Martin on a PBC card in San Antonio Texas but Martin withdrew in pursuit of an IBF title bout.

Breazeale vs. Mansour

On January 26, 2016, Breazeale was involved in a tough bout against fellow American Amir Mansour, during which Breazeale was floored in the third round before coming back to win after Mansour suffered a severe laceration in his mouth after biting through his tongue and was forced to quit on his stool at the end of the fifth round.

Breazeale vs. Joshua

In April 2016, Breazeale was selected as the opponent for Anthony Joshua's first defense of his IBF heavyweight title, with the fight taking place on June 25, 2016 at the O2 Arena in London. Breazeale had little success and the fight was eventually stopped in the seventh round after Breazeale was knocked down for the second time.

Breazeale vs. Ugonoh
On February 25, 2017, Breazeale fought undefeated heavyweight prospect Izu Ugonoh as a replacement over Artur Szpilka. According to Breazeale, Szpilka wanted to push the fight to a later date because he wanted more time to train and Breazeale didn't want that, he wanted to get back to the ring as soon as possible. This was his first fight back since his loss to Anthony Joshua. The fight saw explosive action with Ugonoh being dropped to the canvas in the third round. Ugonoh came back to hurt Breazeale and drop him in the 4th round. Breazeale eventually came out on top after he knocked Ugonoh through the ropes in the 5th round. The fight won round of the year from the Ring Magazine for the third round.

Breazeale vs. Molina
On November 4, 2017, Breazeale fought former world title challenger Eric Molina, on the undercard of the Deontay Wilder vs Bermane Stiverne rematch. Molina was ranked #12 by the WBC at the time. Breazeale won the fight after Molina did not come out from his corner after the 8th round. Breazeale had dropped Molina in the 8th round.

Breazeale vs. Negron 
In his next fight, Breazeale fought Carlos Negron. Breazeale won the fight in the ninth round via KO.

Breazeale vs. Wilder

On May 18, 2019, Breazeale faced WBC Heavyweight Champion Deontay Wilder and was knocked out in the first round. Wilder caught him with a powerful right which sent Breazeale's head onto the canvas and his body flat on his back and unable to continue with the referee waving off the contest after reaching the ten count. This marked his second ever professional loss.

Breazeale vs. Wallin 
In his next fight, Dominic Breazeale faced Otto Wallin who was ranked #14 by the IBF and #15 by the WBA at heavyweight. Wallin dominated Breazeale throughout most of the fight, and won the fight convincingly on all three scorecards, 118–110, 117–111 and 116–112.

Professional boxing record

References

External links

Dominic Breazeale profile at Premier Boxing Champions
Dominic Breazeale - Profile, News Archive & Current Rankings at Box.Live

1985 births
Living people
Heavyweight boxers
American football quarterbacks
Northern Colorado Bears football players
Boxers at the 2012 Summer Olympics
Olympic boxers of the United States
Sportspeople from Alhambra, California
Boxers from California
American male boxers
African-American boxers
21st-century African-American sportspeople
20th-century African-American people